PPADS (pyridoxalphosphate-6-azophenyl-2',4'-disulfonic acid) is a selective purinergic P2X antagonist.  It is able to block contractions of rabbit vas deferens induced by ATP or α,β,methylene-ATP. It appears to be relatively selective for P2X receptors, having no appreciable activity at α1 adrenergic, muscarinic M2 and M3, histamine H1, and adenosine A1 receptors.

References

Azo compounds
Organophosphates
Pyridines
Sulfonic acids